Pseudomelittia is a genus of moths in the family Sesiidae.

Species
Pseudomelittia andraenipennis (Walker, 1856)
Pseudomelittia berlandi  Le Cerf, 1917
Pseudomelittia cingulata  Gaede, 1929

References

Sesiidae